Carlyle's House, in Cheyne Row, Chelsea, central London, was the home of the Scottish essayist, historian and philosopher Thomas Carlyle and his wife Jane from 1834 until his death. The home of these writers was purchased by public subscription and placed in the care of the Carlyle's House Memorial Trust in 1895. They opened the house to the public and maintained it until 1936, when control of the property was assumed by the National Trust, inspired by co-founder Octavia Hill's earlier pledge of support for the house. It became a Grade II listed building in 1954 and is open to the public as a historic house museum.

The Carlyles in residence 

In the early months of 1834, Carlyle had decided to move from Craigenputtock, the couple's residence in Dumfriesshire, Scotland, to London. He arrived in London in May, seeking his friend Leigh Hunt, whom he had asked to keep an eye out for a likely property. Carlyle, discovering that Hunt had done nothing of the kind, found a promising house himself, very close to the Hunt residence in Chelsea. The Carlyles moved into 5 Cheyne Row on 10 June 1834; the street address was changed to 24 in 1877. The house became central to Victorian intellectual life, a place of pilgrimage for literati, scientists, clergymen and political figures from all over Europe and North America. Carlyle did most of his writing there from The French Revolution onward.

The building dates from 1708 and is a typical Georgian terraced house, a modestly comfortable home where the Carlyles lived with one servant and Jane's dog, Nero. It is preserved very much as it was when the Carlyles lived there, despite a later occupant with scores of cats and dogs. It is a good example of a middle-class Victorian home. Devotees tracked down many items of furniture owned by the Carlyles. It contains some of the Carlyles' books (many on permanent loan from the London Library, which was established by Carlyle). It also contains pictures, personal possessions, portraits by artists such as James Abbott McNeill Whistler and Helen Allingham, and memorabilia assembled by their admirers.

The house is made up of four floors. The kitchen is in the basement. The ground floor was the parlour. The first floor holds both the drawing room/library and Jane's bedroom. Thomas's bedroom was on the second floor and is now the custodian's residence. While researching in preparation for his History of Frederick the Great, Carlyle found the noise from the street and his neighbours intolerable, so in 1854 he had a "soundproof room" constructed in the top story. The house has a small walled garden which is preserved much as it was when Thomas and Jane lived there; the fig tree still produces fruit.

The house may have been the model for the Hilberrys' house in Virginia Woolf's Night and Day (1919).

Stanford and Thea Holme 

The theatre producer Stanford Holme became curator of the house and moved there with his wife, the actress Thea Holme, in 1959. She took up writing, beginning with a book about the lives of Thomas and Jane Carlyle at the house, The Carlyles at Home (1965).

Bibliography

References

External links
 
 

National Trust properties in London
Biographical museums in London
Thomas Carlyle
Houses completed in 1708
Literary museums in London
Historic house museums in London
Museums in the Royal Borough of Kensington and Chelsea
Houses in the Royal Borough of Kensington and Chelsea
1708 establishments in England
Grade II* listed buildings in the Royal Borough of Kensington and Chelsea